Milejów may refer to the following places:
Milejów, Piotrków County in Łódź Voivodeship (central Poland)
Milejów, Wieluń County in Łódź Voivodeship (central Poland)
Milejów, Lublin Voivodeship (east Poland)
Milejów, Greater Poland Voivodeship (west-central Poland)